George Jack Warren Kerrigan (July 25, 1879 – June 9, 1947) was an American silent film actor and film director.

Controversy
In May 1917, Kerrigan was nearing the end of a four-month-long personal appearance publicity tour that had taken him across the United States and into Canada. At one of the final stops, a reporter for The Denver Times asked Kerrigan if he would be joining the war. Kerrigan replied:

Picked up and reprinted in newspapers across the country, this statement stunned his fans and his popularity plummeted, never to fully recover.

Family members later claimed in Behind the Screen (2001) by William J. Mann that his slump in popularity was more due to his living with his mother and partner James Vincent in the same house, and not having a business manager to overcome the negative publicity.

Revival
In the spring of 1924, after John Barrymore bowed out, Kerrigan was assigned the starring role in Captain Blood. While the film was a moderate success, critics were unmoved and Kerrigan found himself working less and less and in smaller roles. In December 1924, Kerrigan was injured in an automobile accident in Illinois. According to the Des Moines Tribune (page 1, Monday, December 8, 1924) his face was badly scarred and it was stated that "he may never star in films again".

Personal life and death
Kerrigan lived with his domestic partner James Carroll Vincent from about 1914 until Kerrigan's death in 1947.

James Carroll Vincent
James Carroll Vincent (November 9, 1897 – May 15, 1948) was a silent movie actor. He was born in Baltimore, Maryland, and moved to California to be an actor where he met Kerrigan. Vincent moved into Kerrigan's home at 2307 Cahuenga Boulevard in Los Angeles, where they began a long-term relationship. He was listed at various times as Kerrigan's secretary or gardener. Not to be confused with actor James Vincent, born in 1882 and only three years younger than Kerrigan, while his partner is described as being much younger than Kerrigan; or stage manager James Vincent (who worked with Katharine Cornell and was long-time friend of George Cukor), born in 1900 who committed suicide in 1953 in New York City.

In 1919 Vincent, who was a "juvenile" actor with Bessie Barriscale, appeared in the cast of Out of Court, in 1920 he was in the cast of The Coast of Opportunity and in 1924 in the cast of $30,000, all three of them movies with or by Kerrigan. In 1924, Kerrigan and Vincent, along with several of their friends, were in an automobile accident in Dixon, Illinois, on the route from Sterling to Chicago. In news reports Vincent was again named as Kerrigan's secretary.

On June 9, 1947, Kerrigan died from pneumonia at the age of 67. He is buried at Forest Lawn Memorial Park in Glendale, California.

After Kerrigan's death, Vincent married Mitty Lee Turner (1894-1968) on October 24, 1947. On March 15, 1948, Vincent committed suicide by gas in his bedroom at 14716 Magnolia Boulevard in Van Nuys, California, nine months after the death of Kerrigan. He is buried at Forest Lawn Memorial Park in Glendale, California.

Filmography

References

External links

J. Warren Kerrigan at Virtual History
Early portrait of Kerrigan

1879 births
1947 deaths
Male actors from Louisville, Kentucky
American male film actors
American film directors
American male silent film actors
Burials at Forest Lawn Memorial Park (Glendale)
American gay actors
Deaths from pneumonia in California
LGBT people from Indiana
Silent film directors
Vaudeville performers
20th-century American male actors